Leroy Matlock (March 12, 1907 - February 6, 1968) was an American baseball pitcher in the Negro leagues. He played from 1929 to 1938 with several teams. He was selected to the 1935 and the 1936 East-West All-Star Game. Matlock was considered one of the top left handed pitchers of the 1930s.

At age 45, Matlock received votes listing him on the 1952 Pittsburgh Courier player-voted poll of the Negro leagues' best players ever.

He is listed as buried in the Elmhurst Cemetery in St. Paul, Minnesota.

References

External links

 and Baseball-Reference Black Baseball and Mexican League stats and Seamheads

1907 births
1968 deaths
Homestead Grays players
St. Louis Stars (baseball) players
Pittsburgh Crawfords players
Baseball players from Missouri
Burials in Minnesota
People from Moberly, Missouri
20th-century African-American sportspeople
Baseball pitchers